Pong Cheng-sheng is a Taiwanese politician.

Education
Pong obtained his master's degree in construction engineering and doctoral degree in engineering science and technology, both from National Kaohsiung First University of Science and Technology.

Political careers
Pong is currently the Deputy Mayor of Taipei since 25 December 2018.

References

Living people
Deputy mayors of Taipei
National Kaohsiung University of Science and Technology alumni
Year of birth missing (living people)